Neocautinella is a monotypic genus of South American dwarf spiders containing the single species, Neocautinella neoterica. It was first described by L. L. Baert in 1990, and has only been found in Bolivia, Ecuador, and Peru.

See also
 List of Linyphiidae species (I–P)

References

Linyphiidae
Monotypic Araneomorphae genera
Spiders of South America